Raffaele de Courten (Milan, 23 September 1888 – Frascati, 23 August 1978) was an Italian admiral. He was the last Chief of Staff of the Regia Marina.

Life
Raffaele de Courten was born in Milan in 1888. He joined the Naval Academy of Leghorn in 1906 and graduated in 1910. He served on the battleships Vittorio Emanuele and Benedetto Brin, before joining the naval air arm just before World War I. In May 1915, during a bombardment of Pula onboard the airship Città di Jesi, he was captured when the airship was shot down and remained prisoner of the Austro-Hungarian Army till June 1917. After the war, he was assigned to the Naval Staff, commanded flotillas of destroyers and submarines, and from 1933 to 1936 he was naval attaché in Germany. He was promoted Rear admiral in 1938.

When Italy joined the war on 10 June 1940, Courten first commanded from August 1941 to March 1942 the 7th Division, in which he participated to the First Battle of Sirte. He then commanded the 8th Division, and participated in the successful contrast to Operation Vigorous. He was decorated with a Silver Medal of Military Valor.

When Benito Mussolini was deposed, Courten was chosen to become Minister of the Navy, while subsequently replacing Arturo Riccardi as Chief of Staff of the Italian Navy. When the Armistice of Cassibile was announced, he convinced the fleet commander Carlo Bergamini to comply with the clauses and not to scuttle the ships (in fear that they would be given up to the Allies); afterwards, he joined the King and the Prime Minister Badoglio in their flight to Brindisi.

On 23 September Courten and Admiral Andrew Cunningham met at Taranto and reached the so-called Gentlemen's Agreement, which defined the collaboration of the Regia Marina with the Allies. He remained Minister until July 1946 and Chief of Staff until December 1946, when he resigned to protest the clauses of the Paris Peace Treaties.

From 1952 to 1959 Courten was president of the Lloyd Triestino. He died at Frascati on 23 August 1978.

References
 

1888 births
1978 deaths
Military personnel from Milan
Italian admirals
Bonomi II Cabinet
Bonomi III Cabinet
Italian military personnel of the Italo-Turkish War
Italian military personnel of World War I
Regia Marina personnel of World War II
Admirals of World War II